The 1962 edition of the Campeonato Carioca kicked off on June 30, 1962 and ended on December 16, 1962. It was organized by FCF (Federação Carioca de Futebol, or Carioca Football Federation). Thirteen teams participated. Botafogo won the title for the 12th time. no teams were relegated.

System
The tournament would be disputed in a double round-robin format, with the team with the most points winning the title.

Championship

References

Campeonato Carioca seasons
Carioca